Ionuț Balaban (born 23 May 1996) is a Romanian rugby union football player. He plays as a centre for professional Fédérale 1 club Sporting Club Appaméen

Club career

Ionuț Balaban started playing rugby in 2010 at CSS Bârlad, a school based club under the guidance of coaches Ciprian Popa and Ioan Harnagea. He was selected for the senior team of the club making his debut in Divizia Națională, the second tier of Romanian rugby league system. After some impressive performances he was signed at the beginning of 2016 by Dinamo București. After two seasons with the Bucharest team he transferred to Știința Baia Mare. In January 2020 he was signed by SuperLiga side Gloria Buzău.In July 2020 he was signed by SuperLiga team SCM Timișoara

International career

Balaban also played for the Romania national under-20 rugby union team and Romania national rugby sevens team. Balaban is also selected for Romania's national team, the Oaks, making his international debut at the 2016 World Rugby Nations Cup in a match against the Welwitschias.He was the youngest rugby player in Romania to be selected for Romanian's national team, the Oaks

References

External links
 
 
 
 Ionuț Balaban at Gloria Buzău website (in Romanian)

1996 births
Living people
Sportspeople from Bârlad
Romanian rugby union players
Romania international rugby union players
CS Dinamo București (rugby union) players
CSM Știința Baia Mare players
SCM Gloria Buzău (rugby union) players
Rugby union centres